The 1992 Utah Utes football team represented the University of Utah as a member of the Western Athletic Conference (WAC) during the 1992 NCAA Division I-A football season. In their third season under head coach Ron McBride, the Utes compiled an overall record of 6–6 record with a mark of 4–4 against conference opponents, tied for fifth place in the WAC, and outscored their opponents 320 to 289. Utah was invited to the Copper Bowl, where they lost to the Washington State. It was the program first appearance in a bowl game since the 1964 season. The team played home games at Robert Rice Stadium in Salt Lake City.

Schedule

Roster

References

Utah
Utah Utes football seasons
Utah Utes football